Saint-Éloy-de-Gy is a commune in the Cher department in the Centre-Val de Loire region of France.

Geography

Population

Sights
 The church of St. Éloy, dating from the twelfth century.
 The fifteenth-century Château de Dame.

See also
Communes of the Cher department

References

External links

The commune’s sports association website 

Communes of Cher (department)